The 2027 FIFA Women's World Cup is scheduled to be the tenth edition of the FIFA Women's World Cup, the quadrennial international women's association football championship contested by the national teams of the member associations of FIFA. The tournament will involve 32 national teams, including that of the host nation, after FIFA announced the expansion of the tournament in July 2019.

Host selection
The bidding process has not started yet, but several proposed bids for the World Cup have been announced. The host will be appointed by the FIFA Congress in the second quarter of 2024 with bid regulations for approval in March 2023.

Confirmed bids

Belgium, Germany, and the Netherlands

On 19 October 2020, the football associations of Belgium, Germany, and the Netherlands announced their intention to jointly bid for the 2027 FIFA Women's World Cup. The intention is for the three countries to make further agreements about the organization before the end of this year and to record this in a covenant. Belgium and the Netherlands jointly hosted the UEFA European Championship in 2000, with Belgium having previously hosted in 1972. Germany hosted the FIFA Women's World Cup in 2011 and the UEFA European Women's Championship in 2001. Germany also hosted the FIFA Men's World Cup in 1974 and 2006, the men's Euro in 1988, and will do so again in 2024. Germany and the Netherlands co-hosted several matches in the multi-national UEFA Euro 2020. The Netherlands hosted the Women's Euro in 2017. The host cities of Germany are Dortmund, Duisburg, Düsseldorf and Cologne.

South Africa

Motivated by the success of the country's recent participation in FIFA women's tournaments, the South African Football Association previously submitted a bid for the 2023 FIFA Women's World Cup, but withdrew its bid in December 2019. SAFA CEO Hay Mokoena stated that South Africa would consider bidding for 2027 after the women's league and national team become more competitive. South Africa has hosted the 2009 FIFA Confederations Cup and the 2010 FIFA World Cup and could use the infrastructure that was built for the tournament. In September 2022, South Africa announced its bid to host the 2027 women's edition.

Brazil

The Brazilian Football Confederation (CBF), along with the city hall of Rio de Janeiro, have expressed interest in participating in the election for the 2027 World Cup. The country was already one of the finalists for the 2023 edition, but had to withdraw its candidacy due to the lack of support from the federal government, in addition to the financial crisis caused by the COVID-19 pandemic. The project is part of a study carried out by the Rio Convention & Visitors Bureau (RCV), which also makes possible other events with Olympic sports and FIFA tournaments in Rio de Janeiro until 2032, including the 2031 Pan American Games, using the wonderful city again as host (since it hosted the competition in 2007), reusing the structures used in the 2016 Summer Olympics and Paralympics. The country has twice hosted the men's version of the World Cup, in 1950 and 2014, in addition to the 2013 Confederations Cup.

On 1 March 2023, the city of São Paulo expressed interest in participating in the election with Rio de Janeiro, offering the Arena Corinthians and Allianz Parque to receive the matches. The next day, CBF President Ednaldo Rodrigues sent a letter to FIFA, confirming the country's intention to compete in the 2027 World Cup. Other Brazilian cities can also participate in the project, as the event involves the entire country. On 7 March the Brazilian Minister of Sports, Ana Moser, confirmed the country's bid to host the tournament. Then, the cities of Salvador, Brasília, Cuiabá, Belém, Manaus and Fortaleza also offered to host the World Cup in an event on SAFs and the football capital market, organized by the Getúlio Vargas Foundation (FGV) on 11 March. Among the capitals that offered, only Belém did not host the last men's World Cup in the country in 2014, losing its place to Manaus.

Interested bids

Chile
After the successful participation at the 2019 FIFA Women's World Cup in France, then-sports minister Pauline Kantor, announced the intention to propose a bid for 2027 edition, saying, "Particularly, yes. Absolutely. It is a dream for all the development that implies. The World Cup is not just an event. The World Cup also leaves infrastructure and leaves interest. I believe that a Women's World Cup would leave an interest in all the girls, who continue and do it, but who could see themselves even more identified with their referents." To enhance the bid, Chile officially made its women's domestic league fully professional after 2022–23 season, with the first professional season to be played in 2023. Chile has hosted the 1962 FIFA World Cup, 1987 FIFA World Youth Championship, 2008 FIFA U-20 Women's World Cup and the 2015 FIFA U-17 World Cup. Santiago will host the 2023 Pan American Games and Parapan American Games from October to November of that year. The country is also co-bidding to host the 2030 FIFA World Cup. By the time Chile showed interests to bid, the Women's World Cup has never been hosted by a South American nation.

Denmark, Finland, Iceland, Norway, and Sweden

The Nordic countries (Denmark, Finland, Iceland, Norway, and Sweden) have expressed interest in a combined bid to host the World Cup, with a statement from Norwegian Football Federation president Terje Svendsen saying, "We have a good Nordic co-operation and the Nordic countries have a leading position in women's football." Sweden hosted the 1958 FIFA World Cup and the 1995 FIFA Women's World Cup, becoming the first country to host both men's and women's World Cups. The 2003 FIFA U-17 World Championship was held in Finland. Denmark co-hosted the multi-national UEFA Euro 2020. In June 2019, the Nordic Council declared its support. If successful, it will be the second Women's World Cup to be held in multiple countries after Australia and New Zealand in 2023. These countries have 10 stadiums over 20,000 seats planned to be in place for this event, so there is likely no venue cutting needs and all of the countries have at least one stadium suitable for FIFA size demands in the event.

Italy
On 17 February 2021, President of the Italian Football Federation, Gabriele Gravina, hinted that Italy might seek to host the 2027 Women's World Cup, and has underlined a prolonged plan to improve the status of women's football in Italy, including the professionalisation of the Serie A from autumn 2022 and making Italian female footballers full time professional for the first time. Italy has hosted the men's World Cup twice, in 1934 and 1990, the men's UEFA Euro 1968, UEFA Euro 1980 and UEFA Euro 2020, as well as the UEFA Women's Euro 1993.

Mexico
On 21 June 2022, the president of the Mexican Football Federation, Yon de Luisa, announced interests in hosting the 2027 edition and would seek to make a bid for it. Mexico has never hosted a FIFA Women's World Cup, but has hosted the men's World Cup twice in 1970 and 1986, before going to do it again as joint-host for the 2026 FIFA World Cup.

United States
Before his resignation, former U.S. Soccer president Carlos Cordeiro expressed an interest in having the U.S. host the tournament, stating "I believe we can and should host the FIFA Women's World Cup in 2027." However, it was not known where current president Cindy Parlow Cone could have stood on a possible bid. If it had been successful, this would have seen the U.S. hosting the Women's World Cup one year after co-hosting the 2026 FIFA World Cup and one year before Los Angeles hosts the Summer Olympics again. The United States has previously hosted the 1994 FIFA World Cup and this tournament twice in a row in 1999 and 2003. It was reported on 6 August 2021 that U.S. Soccer was considering a bid for the 2031 Women's World Cup as an alternative before reinstating its plan for 2027 on 17 June 2022. The United States will also host the 2031 Rugby World Cup, meaning that bidding for the same year's FIFA Women's World Cup could cause a scheduling conflict.

Format
The Women's World Cup, since the 2023 edition, opens with a group stage consisting of eight groups of four teams, with the top two teams progressing from each group to a knockout tournament starting with a round of 16 teams. The number of games played overall is 64. The tournament will replicate the format of the men's FIFA World Cup used between 1998 and 2022.

Teams

Qualification

FIFA's confederations organise their qualifications through continental championships, with the exception of UEFA which organises its own qualifying competition. The host(s) will qualify automatically for the tournament, leaving most of the remaining FIFA member associations eligible to enter qualification if they chose to do so. The only exception may be Russia, which is currently under suspension by FIFA and UEFA from all competitions since 28 February 2022 for invading Ukraine four days earlier.

The allocation of slots for each confederation is given below. The slots for the host nation(s) will be taken directly from the quotas allocated to their confederation(s).
AFC (Asia): 6 slots
CAF (Africa): 4 slots 
CONCACAF (North America, Central America and the Caribbean): 4 slots
CONMEBOL (South America): 3 slots
OFC (Oceania): 1 slot
UEFA (Europe): 11 slots
Inter-confederation play-off tournament: 3 slots

A ten-team play-off tournament will decide the final three spots at the Women's World Cup. The play-off slot allocation is as follows:
AFC (Asia): 2 slots
CAF (Africa): 2 slots
CONCACAF (North America, Central America and the Caribbean): 2 slots
CONMEBOL (South America): 2 slots
OFC (Oceania): 1 slot
UEFA (Europe): 1 slot

References

External links
Belgium-Netherlands-Germany bid website
Official FIFA Women's World Cup website

FIFA Women's World Cup tournaments
FIFA Women's World Cup, 2027
FIFA
FIFA